Moji may refer to:

 Onji or hyōon moji (表音文字), phonic characters used in counting beats in Japanese poetry
 Moji-ku, Kitakyūshū, ward (district) of the city of Kitakyūshū, Fukuoka Prefecture, Japan
 Moji Station in that ward, Kyushu Railway Company station on the Kagoshima and Sanyō Main Lines
 ...Moji, 2005 debut album by Swiss singer Salome
 Moji language, Loloish language spoken by the Phula people of Yunnan in southwestern China
 Moji (TV network), a national television network in Indonesia

People with the name Moji include:
 Moji Akinfenwa (fl. 1990s and 2000s), Nigerian politician from Osun State
 Mosese Rauluni (born 1975), Fijian rugby union player nicknamed Moji

See also 
 Mochi (disambiguation)
 Moji-Mirim, municipality in São Paulo state, Brazil
 Moji das Cruzes, alternative spelling for the municipality of Mogi das Cruzes in São Paulo state, Brazil
 Mojibake, unreadable characters caused by text encoding problems